Washtucna may refer to: 

People
Washtucna (chief), a Native American chief

Places
Washtucna, Washington

Ships
, a United States Navy large harbor tug in service from 1973 to 1997 and reinstated as a yard tug YT-801 in 2008